Toma Nikiforov (born 25 January 1993) is a Belgian judoka who competes in the under 100 kg category. In 2015, he won bronze medals at the world championships and European Games. He placed second at the 2016 European championships, but was eliminated in the second bout at the Rio Olympics. He won the gold medal at the 2018 and 2021 European Championships.

Biography
Nikiforov is of Bulgarian origin. As a child, he lived above a judo club and he accompanied his father, who was a judoka. He won the silver medal at the 2010 Summer Youth Olympics. In 2015, he won the bronze medal at the European Championships and at the World Championships. In 2016, he won the silver medal at the European Championships.

He won the gold medal at the 2018 European Judo Championships in the -100kg class, defeating Cyrille Maret in the final with an ippon.

References

External links
 
 
 
 

1993 births
Living people
Olympic judoka of Belgium
Judoka at the 2016 Summer Olympics
Sportspeople from Brussels
Judoka at the 2010 Summer Youth Olympics
Belgian male judoka
Belgian people of Bulgarian descent
Judoka at the 2015 European Games
European Games medalists in judo
European Games bronze medalists for Belgium
Judoka at the 2019 European Games
Judoka at the 2020 Summer Olympics
21st-century Belgian people